Hideki Kaneko (born 6 March 1974) is a former professional tennis player from Japan.

Biography
Kaneko, a left-handed player from Tokyo, began playing tennis at the age of eight. 

Most of his ATP Tour main draw appearances were as a wildcard at his home events, the Japan Open and Tokyo Indoor. The only exception was the 1996 Indonesia Open, which he entered as a qualifier. He made the second round of the Japan Open on three occasions.

His four Davis Cup ties for Japan included a five-set loss to Todd Woodbridge in 1996 and a decisive fifth rubber win over Uzbekistan in Tashkent in 1997.

He was a member of the silver medal winning Japanese team at 1998 Asian Games in Bangkok.

See also
List of Japan Davis Cup team representatives

References

External links
 
 
 

1974 births
Living people
Japanese male tennis players
Sportspeople from Tokyo
Tennis players at the 1998 Asian Games
Asian Games silver medalists for Japan
Asian Games medalists in tennis
Medalists at the 1998 Asian Games
20th-century Japanese people